Pomacea cousini is a South American species of freshwater snail with gills and an operculum, an aquatic gastropod mollusc in the family Ampullariidae, the apple snails.

Distribution
P. cousini is endemic to Ecuador.

References

cousini
Molluscs of South America
Fauna of Ecuador
Gastropods described in 1877